Garvin Bushell (né Garvin Lamont Payne; September 25, 1902 – October 31, 1991) was an American woodwind multi-instrumentalist.

Biography
Bushell was born in Springfield, Ohio, to Alexander Payne, Jr. (1875–1908) and Effie Penn (maiden; 1879–1968). After his father's death, his mother – on January 12, 1910, in Covington, Kentucky – married Rev. Joseph Davenport Bushell (1878–1960). Garvin adopted the surname of his stepfather.

Bushell played both jazz and classical music on clarinet, alto clarinet, oboe, english horn, flute, saxophone, bassoon, and contrabassoon.

He was best known as a jazz sideman with people such as Perry Bradford, and performed and/or recorded with many of jazz's great names, such as Fletcher Henderson, Bunk Johnson, Fats Waller, Cab Calloway, Eric Dolphy, Gil Evans, and John Coltrane. Bushell never recorded as a session leader.

Bushell eventually settled in Las Vegas, Nevada, where he worked as a music teacher.

Family 
Bushell – on July 24, 1923, in Manhattan – married Marie Roberts (maiden; 1902–1971), who, among other things, had been a member of the Chocolate Kiddies chorus for the 1925 European tour. Garvin was a member of the band for that tour.

Bushell – in 1965 in Manhattan – married Louise Olivari (maiden; 1925–1994), to whom he remained married until his death in 1991. Garvin and Louise had two sons, Garvin P. Bushell and Philip Bushell.

Discography
 John Coltrane, Africa/Brass (Impulse!, 1961)
 John Coltrane, The Other Village Vanguard Tapes ABC (Impulse!, 1977)
 Doc Cook/Johnny Dunn, Doc Cook and His Dreamland Orchestra and 14 Doctors of Syncopation/Johnny Dunn and His Band with Jelly Roll Morton (VJM, 1970)
 Wilbur de Paris, The Wild Jazz Age (Atlantic, 1960)
 Wilbur de Paris, On the Riviera (Atlantic, 1962)
 Gil Evans, The Individualism of Gil Evans (Verve, 1964)
 Ella Fitzgerald/Chick Webb, Ella Fitzgerald & the Chick Webb Orchestra (Joker, 1974)
 Fletcher Henderson All Stars, The Big Reunion (Jazztone, 1958)
 Barbara Lea, Lea in Love (Prestige, 1956)
 Kid Ory/Bunk Johnson, New Orleans Legends (CBS, 1975)
 Rex Stewart, Rendezvous with Rex (Felsted, 1959)
 Rex Stewart, Henderson Homecoming (United Artists, 1959)
 Ethel Waters, Ethel Waters 1938–1939 (RCA Victor, 1972)
 Chick Webb Orchestra/Ella Fitzgerald, Live Session at the Savoy Ballroom Harlem December 1939 (Musidisc, 1975)
 Edith Wilson, Edith Wilson/1921-22 (Fountain, 1974)
 Sam Wooding, Sam Wooding & His Chocolate Dandies (Biograph, 1970)

References

External links
Review of Bushell's book Jazz From the Beginning 

1902 births
1991 deaths
Jazz musicians from Ohio
Musicians from Springfield, Ohio
20th-century American male musicians
20th-century classical musicians
20th-century American saxophonists
African-American saxophonists
American classical bassoonists
American classical clarinetists
American classical oboists
American classical saxophonists
American jazz bassoonists
American jazz clarinetists
American jazz oboists
American jazz saxophonists
American male jazz musicians
American male saxophonists
Classical musicians from Ohio
Cor anglais players
Male oboists
20th-century African-American musicians